Mazandaran University of Science and Technology (MUST) is a private university in Babol, Iran.
Mazandaran University of Science and Technology has always been one of the top three non-profit universities in the country since its establishment. 

Mazandaran University of Science & Technology is one of the most prestigious of the non-governmental universities in Iran.
Mazandaran University of Science & Technology is a research university located in the city of Babol in the province of Mazandaran (Northern Iran) 15 km away from Caspian Sea.

MUST was established in 1992 as the first private university in the country under the accreditation of the Ministry of Science, Research and Technology (Iran) by members of its founder committee;
Mr. Morteza Haji, Mr. Mirmehdi Seyyedesfahani, Mr. Ahmad Nourian, Mr. Abbasali Soleimani, Mr. Mohsen Asgarinejhad, Mr. Mohsen Nariman, Mr. Hossein Ramzanianpur, Mr. Alireza Saffarian and Mr. Yusef Asgarinejhad

It offers degrees in Mechanical Engineering, Industrial Engineering, Computer Engineering, Information Technology, Electrical Engineering, Teaching English as a Foreign Language, Civil Engineering, Biomedical Engineering, Architecture, and other subjects, as well as MBA.

Mazandaran University of Science and Technology alumni have gone on to academic and research careers at universities in Iran and across the world or are employed after graduation.

References
https://www.msrt.ir/en/page/1194/private-universities Top private universities

Schools and Departments
Industrial & Systems Engineering Department
Computer Engineering and Information Technology Department
Civil Engineering Department
Business Department
Mechanical Engineering Department
Chemical Engineering Department
Science Department
Foreign Languages Department

Industrial and Civil Engineering at MUST

Mazandaran University of Science & Technology is known for offering both Industrial and Civil Engineering programs including bachelor's degree, Master's degree and PhD degree in the nation. MUST also held 13th International Conference on Industrial Engineering (IIEC 2017) on February 22–23, 2017 in Babolsar, Iran.

Cooperation
Master's degree and PhD courses are taught in English. The university has established cooperation with the Indian Institutes of Technology (IIT) of India in offering MBAs and PhDs in industrial engineering.

External links
MUST Official Website

Education in Mazandaran Province
Universities in Iran
Educational institutions established in 1992
1992 establishments in Iran
Buildings and structures in Mazandaran Province